Suzanne Manet (30 October 1829 – 8 March 1906) was a Dutch-born pianist and the wife of the painter Édouard Manet, for whom she frequently modeled.

Suzanne

An excellent pianist, Leenhoff was initially hired in 1851 by Manet's father, Auguste, as a piano teacher for Édouard and his brothers. Auguste was a domineering figure in Édouard's life, insisting that his son study law and avoid the arts. In their early twenties, Suzanne and Édouard developed a personal relationship and were romantically involved for some ten years. After Édouard left his parents' home, he and Suzanne lived together, although they kept their relationship discreet and secret, especially from Édouard's father. (Leenhoff may also have been Auguste's mistress.)  Leenhoff gave birth out of wedlock to a son, Léon-Edouard Koëlla, on 29 January 1852. The birth certificate gave Leenhoff as the mother but "Koëlla" as the father, an individual never identified and likely invented. Léon was baptised in 1855, and became known as Suzanne's young brother. Suzanne and Édouard were finally married in October 1863, a year after the death of Édouard's father. Édouard never publicly confirmed Léon as his son.

Léon posed often for Édouard Manet. Most famously, he is the subject of the Boy Carrying a Sword of 1861 (Metropolitan Museum of Art, New York). He also appears as the boy carrying a tray in the background of The Balcony.

Portrait by Degas

Édouard Manet and Edgar Degas met by chance at the Louvre in 1862, and after an intense conversation and Manet's demonstration on the art of etching, they became lifelong friends. Sometime in 1868 Degas painted a portrait of Manet and his wife. Manet is reclining on a couch and Suzanne appears to be seated at a piano. The mystery that surrounds the portrait by Degas is the fact that the painting has been slashed from top to bottom and right through the likeness of Suzanne. The supposition is that Manet, for an unknown reason, cut the painting. Manet might have slashed the painting because he did not like the way Suzanne was painted, or because he was feuding at the time with Degas, or he might have been angry with his wife. When Degas saw what had been done to his painting he demanded its return, and he took it back. Degas intended to re-paint the likeness of Suzanne at the piano and he reiterated his intention to Ambroise Vollard in conversation with him around the turn of the century. Degas never got around to fixing the painting and it remains in its slashed state in the Kitakyushu Municipal Museum of Art in Japan.

Suzanne as a model

References

Further reading 
 Suzanne en Edouard Manet: De liefde van een Hollandse pianiste en een Parijse schilder by :nl: Thera Coppens, 2014. , .
 Françoise Cachin in collaboration with Michel Melot: Manet 1832–1883. Réunion des Musées Nationaux, Paris, The Metropolitan Museum of Art, New York, Harry N. Abrams, Inc., New York 1983, .
Jean Sutherland Boggs, Henry Loyrette, Michael Pantazzi, Gary Tinterow, Degas, Réunion des Musées Nationaux, Paris, The Metropolitan Museum of Art, New York, National Gallery of Canada, Ottawa, New York 1988, .
 A. van Anrooy: Impromptu Zaltbommel 1982 
 Otto Friedrich: Edouard Manet und das Paris seiner Zeit Kiepenheuer & Witsch 1994 
 Nancy Locke: Manet and the Family Romance Princeton University Press 2001 
 Gotthard Jedlicka: Manet Zürich 1941
 Toon van Kempen, Nicoline van de Beek Madame Manet Uitgeverij Het Archiefcollectief 2016

External links
Musée d'Orsay, Manet Dossier: chronology
Times Topics, "Edouard Manet", New York Times, 
Norton Simon Museum

Dutch artists' models
French artists' models
Dutch emigrants to France
People from Delft
1829 births
1906 deaths
Dutch women pianists
19th-century French women classical pianists
Édouard Manet